5-MeO-DALT or N,N-di allyl-5-methoxy tryptamine is a psychedelic tryptamine first synthesized by Alexander Shulgin.

Chemistry
The full name of the chemical is N-allyl-N-[2-(5-methoxy-1H-indol-3-yl)ethyl] prop-2-en-1- amine. It is related to the compounds 5-MeO-DPT and DALT.

In April 2020, Chadeayne et al. solved the crystal structure of the freebase form of 5-MeO-DALT.

Pharmacology
5-MeO-DALT binds to 5-HT1A, 5-HT1D, 5-HT1E, 5-HT2A, 5-HT2B, 5-HT2C, 5-HT6, α2A, α2B, α2C, H1, κ-opioid, σ1 and σ2 receptors with Ki values lower than 10μM and also acts as a  DAT and SERT monoamine reuptake inhibitor.

The metabolism and cytochrome P450 inhibition of 5-MeO-DALT has been described in scientific literature.

History
The first material regarding the synthesis and effects of 5-MeO-DALT was sent from Alexander Shulgin to a research associate named Murple in May 2004, after which it was circulated online. In June 2004 5-MeO-DALT became available from internet research chemical vendors after being synthesized by commercial laboratories in China. In August 2004 the synthesis and effects of 5-MeO-DALT were published by Erowid.

Dosage
Doses ranging from 12–20 mg were tested by Alexander Shulgin's research group.

Therapeutic use 
Numerous anecdotal reports and a small-scale trial indicate the potential of 5-MeO-DALT for the treatment of cluster headache, one of the most excruciating conditions known to medicine. These observations are consistent with evidence of efficacy of other chemically-related indoleamines in the treatment of cluster headache.

Side effects
There is no published literature on the toxicity of 5-MeO-DALT.

Legal Status

China

As of October 2015 5-MeO-DALT is a controlled substance in China.

Japan
5-MeO-DALT became a controlled substance in Japan from April 2007, by amendment to the Pharmaceutical Affairs Law.

United Kingdom
5-MeO-DALT became a Class A drug in the UK on January 7, 2015 after an update to the tryptamine blanket ban.

Singapore
5-MeO-DALT is listed in the Fifth Schedule of the Misuse of Drugs Act (MDA) and therefore illegal in Singapore as of May 2015.

Sweden
Sveriges riksdag added 5-MeO-DALT to schedule I ("substances, plant materials and fungi which normally do not have medical use") as narcotics in Sweden as of May 1, 2012, published by Medical Products Agency in their regulation LVFS 2012:6 listed as 5-MeO-DALT N-allyl-N-[2-(5-metoxi-1H-indol-3-yl)etyl]-prop-2-en-1-amin.

United States
5-MeO-DALT is not scheduled at the federal level in the United States, but it is likely that it could be considered an analog of 5-Meo-DiPT, which is a controlled substance in USA, or an analog of another tryptamine, in which case purchase, sale, or possession could be prosecuted under the Federal Analog Act.

Florida
5-MeO-DALT is a Schedule I controlled substance in the state of Florida making it illegal to buy, sell, or possess in Florida.

Louisiana
5-MeO-DALT is a Schedule I controlled substance in the state of Louisiana making it illegal to buy, sell, or possess in Louisiana.

Notes

External links 
 Erowid 5-MeO-DALT vault
 5-MeO-DALT Thread at UKChemicalResearch

Designer drugs
Entactogens and empathogens
Entheogens
Mexamines
Psychedelic tryptamines
Tertiary amines
Allylamines